Moment Factory is a multimedia entertainment studio specializing in the design and production of immersive environments, combining video, lighting, architecture, sound, and special effects. Headquartered in Montreal, the studio also has offices in Paris, Tokyo, New York and Singapore. Since its inception in 2001, Moment Factory has created 525 shows worldwide, including the Lumina Night Walks. Productions span the globe and include such clients as Disney, Universal Studios, Changi Airport, Los Angeles International Airport (LAX), Microsoft, NFL, Sony, Toyota, the Sagrada Familia in Barcelona, and Royal Caribbean International. They have also worked with musical artists like Madonna, Nine Inch Nails, Phish, Red Hot Chili Peppers, Muse, Bon Jovi, Ed Sheeran, Imagine Dragons, Justin Timberlake, Jay-Z, and Namie Amuro.

Team 
Moment Factory's team consists of graphic and motion designers, multimedia directors, illustrators, architects, lighting designers, musicians, environment designers, producers, programmers, engineers, technicians and developers.
Key people are Dominic Audet, Cofounder and Chief of Innovation, Sakchin Bessette, Cofounder and Creative and Executive Director and Éric Fournier, Partner and Executive Producer.

Awards & Distinctions

References 

Companies based in Montreal